Posyolok sovkhoza 2-ya Pyatiletka is a rural locality (a khutor) and the administrative center of Stepnyanskoye Rural Settlement, Liskinsky District, Voronezh Oblast, Russia. The population was 1,161 as of 2010. There are 17 streets.

Geography 
It is located 15 km north of Liski (the district's administrative centre) by road. Vysokoye is the nearest rural locality.

References 

Rural localities in Liskinsky District